This is a list of winners of the Nandi Award for Best Art Director.

References

Art Director